Yunyoo is the capital of the Yunyoo-Nasuan District in the North East Region of Ghana. The district was one of the new ones inaugurated on 15 March 2018 in Ghana.

Yunyoo is linked by a road entering it from Bongpolugu in the east and running westwards and connecting to the N2 highway at its end. It is at an elevation of 252 metres. The nearest airport in Ghana is the Tamale Airport in the capital of the Northern Region.

Nakpanduri is located to the north west, Nasuan to the west and Bunkpurugu to the east.

See also
Yunyoo (Ghana parliament constituency)

References 

Populated places in the North East Region (Ghana)